Vyacheslav "Slava" Malakeev (born July 26, 1973) is a football coach in his former team FC Viikingit.

Career
Malakeev played in the Russian Football National League with FC Torpedo Volzhsky.

Next season 2014 they play in Finnish First Division (Ykkönen). He holds Finnish citizenship.

External links

1973 births
Living people
Soviet footballers
Russian footballers
Association football forwards
Veikkausliiga players
FC Energiya Volzhsky players
Myllykosken Pallo −47 players
AC Allianssi players
FC Viikingit players
Russian expatriate footballers
Expatriate footballers in Finland
Finnish people of Russian descent
Naturalized citizens of Finland
Russian expatriate sportspeople in Finland
Sportspeople from Volgograd